Reille may refer to:

 André Charles Victor Reille (1815–1887), French general.
 Honoré Charles Reille (1775–1860), Marshal of France
 René Reille (1835–1898), French soldier, industrialist and politician